The 2018 Valdostan regional election took place on 20 May 2018 in Aosta Valley, Italy.

Background 
The 2013 regional election confirmed the incumbent autonomist coalition government, led by the Valdostan Union (UV), which retained its absolute majority in the Regional Council of Aosta Valley. The coalition lost 14pp from 2008, however.

In July 2015 the regional government, which had been led by UV's Augusto Rollandin since 2008 (he had been President also in 1984–1990 and senator for Aosta Valley in 2001–2006), was enlarged to the centre-left Democratic Party (PD). In June 2016, after months of negotiations, the government was joined also by the Progressive Valdostan Union (UVP).

In March 2017 the UVP left the government and, along with Edelweiss (SA), Autonomy Liberty Participation Ecology (ALPE) and For Our Valley (PNV), formed a new government without the UV, under President Pierluigi Marquis (SA). Finally, in October, Marquis resigned and was replaced by UVP's Laurent Viérin at the head of a coalition composed of the UV, the UVP, the Valdostan Autonomist Popular Edelweiss (EPAV) and the PD.

Parties and candidate 
This is the list of parties that participated in the election.

Results 
<onlyinclude>

Popular vote by list

References

Elections in Aosta Valley
2018 elections in Italy
May 2018 events in Italy